Marcus Slingenberg (21 October 1881 in Beerta – 9 May 1941 in Haarlem) was a Dutch politician of the Free-thinking Democratic League (VDB). He was among others an alderman of Haarlem.

References
Mr. M. Slingenberg at www.parlement.com

1881 births
1941 deaths
Aldermen in North Holland
Politicians from Haarlem
20th-century Dutch lawyers
Free-thinking Democratic League politicians
Members of the Provincial Council of North Holland
Members of the Provincial-Executive of North Holland
Members of the Senate (Netherlands)
Ministers of Social Affairs of the Netherlands
People from Oldambt (municipality)
University of Groningen alumni